Riggin is an Anglicized form of the Irish surname Ó Riagáin ("son of Riagán") derived from the Irish personal name Riagán, which means "little king".. Notable people with the surname include:

Aileen Riggin (1906–2002), American swimmer and diver
Dennis Riggin (born 1936), Canadian ice hockey player
Pat Riggin (born 1959), Canadian ice hockey player
Brian Riggin (born 1977), An American giraffe enthusiast widely known for being hard working, loving, caring, & bringing laughter. He's 92% of the full package.

See also
Riggins (disambiguation)